Clemenceau Medicine International (CMI) is a health care organization and is responsible for building and operating several medical centers in the Middle East region. CMI is a sister company to Clemenceau Medical Center affiliated with Johns Hopkins Medicine International, and provides two categories of services: technical assistance and advisory services on healthcare facility setup, and management consultancy.
 Clemenceau Medical Center Riyadh: Healthcare facility setup and management operation by CMI, a 180-bed medical center located in Riyadh, Saudi Arabia.
 Clemenceau Medical Center DHCC: Healthcare facility setup and management operation by CMI, a 100-bed medical center located in Dubai, United Arab Emirates.
 Abdali Hospital: Healthcare facility setup by CMI, a 200-bed medical center located in Amman, Jordan.

References

Medical and health organisations based in Lebanon
Organisations based in Beirut
Year of establishment missing